The following radio stations broadcast on AM frequency 620 kHz: 620 AM is a Regional broadcast frequency.

In Antigua and Barbuda 
 V2C-AM in Saint John's

In Argentina 
 LRA18 in El Turbio
 LRA26 in Resistencia, Chaco
 LRA28 La Rioja, La Rioja
 LT17 in Posadas, Misiones
 LV4 in San Rafael, Mendoza

In Brazil 
 ZYH-270 in Pelotas
 ZYH-293 in Lábrea
 ZYH-590 in Fortaleza
 ZYH-777 in Pires do Rio
 ZYJ-332 in Jandaia do Sul
 ZYJ-779 in Rio do Sul
 ZYK-315 in Tenente Portela
 ZYK-521 in São Paulo
 ZYL240 in Ibiá
 ZYL320 in Porteirinha
 ZYL357 in Manhuaçu

In Canada

In Chile 
 CA-062 in Ovalle
 CC-062 in Concepción

In Colombia 
 HJEL in Santiago de Cali
 HJVP in Cartagena
 HJR26 in Cúcuta

In Cuba 
 CMDA in Colón
 CMKF in Moa

In the Dominican Republic 
 HIB28 (formerly HISD) in Santo Domingo

In Ecuador 
 HCXY1 in Loja

In Guatemala 
 TGTQ in Coatepeque / La Reforma / Santa Clara

In Honduras 
 HRDP 5 in La Esperanza
 HRLP 17 in San Pedro Sula

In Jamaica 
 JBC in Spur Tree

In Mexico 
 XEGH-AM in Río Bravo, Tamaulipas
 XEGMSR-AM in Villahermosa, Tabasco
 XENK-AM in Mexico City (San Andrés de la Cañada, State of Mexico)
 XESS-AM in Puerto Nuevo, Baja California

In Nicaragua 
 YNA3RN (Formerly YNGR1) in Tipitapa

In Panama 
 HOQ 53 in Los Algarrobos

In Paraguay 
 ZP 40 in San Estanislao de Kostka (Santaní)

In Peru 
 OAX2M in Chepen
 OCY4A in Estrella Sur

In Saint Lucia 
 RSL in Castries

In the United States

In Venezuela 
 YVNO in Cabimas

External links

 FCC list of radio stations on 620 kHz

References

Lists of radio stations by frequency